Events from the year 1901 in Sweden

Incumbents
 Monarch – Oscar II 
 Prime Minister – Fredrik von Otter

Events
 9–17 February – The first Nordic Games take place in Stockholm.
 A military reform abolish the Allotment system with conscription. 
 Women are given four weeks maternity leave.
 Foundation of the Swedish Union of Journalists.
 A name ordinance is put in legal effect, regulating the uses of first names, surnames and family names .

Popular culture

Theatre
 Easter, play by August Strindberg. 
 A Dream Play by August Strindberg.

Births

 28 March – Princess Märtha of Sweden (died 1954)
 13 June – Tage Erlander, politician (died 1985)
 18 August – Arne Borg, swimmer (died 1979)
 13 October – Irja Agnes Browallius, writer (died 1968)

Deaths
 11 April – Ivar Hallström, composer  (born 1826)
 24 April – Arvid Posse, prime minister (born 1828)
 5 May – Axel Wilhelm Eriksson, Swedish settler and trader in South-West Africa (born 1846)
 12 August –  Adolf Erik Nordenskiöld, baron, botanist, geologist, mineralogist and arctic explorer (born 1832)
 24 August – Gunnar Wennerberg, poet (born 1817)
 10 September - Emanuella Carlbeck, social reformer (born 1829)
 - Hilda Caselli, educational reformer (born 1836)
 - Axel Elmlund, ballet dancer and stage actor (born 1838)

References

 
Sweden
Years of the 20th century in Sweden